The ninth series of Comedy Playhouse, the long-running BBC series, consisted of four episodes and aired from 18 December 1969 to 15 January 1970.

Background
Series Nine, which was the first to be in colour, consisted of four episodes, each of which had a different cast, storyline and writer. None of the episodes made it to its own series. All episodes were aired on Thursday at 7:30pm on BBC1 and were 30 minutes long.

Episodes

References
Mark Lewisohn, "Radio Times Guide to TV Comedy", BBC Worldwide Ltd, 2003
British TV Comedy Guide for Comedy Playhouse

Comedy Playhouse (series 9)